is a Japanese former swimmer who competed in the 1992 Summer Olympics.

References

1975 births
Living people
Japanese female breaststroke swimmers
Olympic swimmers of Japan
Swimmers at the 1992 Summer Olympics
Asian Games medalists in swimming
Swimmers at the 1990 Asian Games
Asian Games silver medalists for Japan
Asian Games bronze medalists for Japan
Sportspeople from Saitama (city)
Medalists at the 1990 Asian Games
20th-century Japanese women